Amphisbaena townsendi is a species of amphibaenian in the family Amphisbaenidae. The species is endemic to Peru.

Etymology
The specific name, townsendi, is in honor of American zoologist Charles Haskins Townsend.

Description

Reproduction
A. townsendi is oviparous.

References

Further reading
Gans C (2005). "Checklist and Bibliography of the Amphisbaenia of the World". Bulletin of the American Museum of Natural History (289): 1–130. (Amphisbaena townsendi, p. 20).
Stejneger L (1911). "Description of a new Amphisbænoid lizard from Peru". Proceedings of the United States National Museum 41: 283–284. (Amphisbæna townsendi, new species).

townsendi
Reptiles described in 1911
Taxa named by Leonhard Stejneger
Endemic fauna of Peru
Reptiles of Peru